William Parker, 13th Baron Morley, 4th Baron Monteagle (15751 July 1622), was an English peer, best known for his role in the discovery of the Gunpowder Plot. In 1605 Parker was due to attend the opening of Parliament. He was a member of the House of Lords as Lord Monteagle, the title on his mother's side. He received a letter; it appears that someone, presumably a fellow Catholic, was afraid he would be blown up. The so-called Monteagle letter survives in the National Archives (SP 14/216/2), but its origin remains mysterious.

Early life
William was the eldest son of Edward Parker, 12th Baron Morley (died 1618), and of Elizabeth Stanley, daughter and heiress of William Stanley, 3rd Baron Monteagle (died 1581). He had both a younger brother, Charles, and a younger sister, Mary.

William's father was a recusant, but appears to have been in favour at court; he was one of the noblemen who tried Mary, Queen of Scots. However, William was allied with many Roman Catholic families, and during the reign of Queen Elizabeth I was in sympathy with their cause.  His wife, the daughter of Sir Thomas Tresham, came from a well-known Roman Catholic family. His sister married Thomas Habington, also a Roman Catholic. He was knighted while with Robert Devereux, 2nd Earl of Essex, in Ireland in 1599, and in 1601 he took part in the latter's rebellion in London. He was punished by imprisonment and a fine of £8,000.

Having close ties with the extremist Catholic faction during Queen Elizabeth I's rule, and a hand in organising Thomas Winter's mission to Spain in 1602, William Parker later declared to be "done with all formal plots" after King James I took the throne. Parker even went as far as writing a letter to his new king with a promise to follow the state religion. Like some reformers, Parker blamed his childhood for his previous wrongdoings, stating: "I knew no better."

Gunpowder Plot

Background
When King James I began his reign, English Catholics had hoped that the persecution felt for over 45 years under his predecessor Queen Elizabeth would finally end. Though more tolerant than others before him, James was still faced with plots and schemes by priests and rebels trying to end the mistreatment of Catholics through force (Fraser 63). To please the Protestants, who were distressed over the growing strength of the Catholic religion, James proclaimed his detestation of Catholics in England. Once again priests were expelled, fines were taxed, and Catholics went back to living a hidden life, but some Catholics were not so accepting of the secretive nature in which they had to practise their faith.

In 1604 Robert Catesby, a devout Catholic with a magnetic personality, recruited friends and rebels to meet and discuss his plot to blow up the House of Lords in an attempt to reestablish Catholicism in England. Those present at that first meeting with Catesby were Thomas Wintour, John Wright, Thomas Percy and Guy Fawkes. With the imminent threat of plague, Parliament postponed re-opening until 5 November 1605, which gave the plotters ample time to lease out a small house in the centre of London where Fawkes would live under the alias "John Johnson" as Thomas Percy's servant while gathering the gunpowder necessary (Fraser 174). By March 1605, the 36 barrels of gunpowder were moved to the newly leased out cellar directly under the House of Lords.

On 26 October an anonymous letter warned Lord Monteagle to avoid the opening of Parliament. This letter was possibly sent by Monteagle's brother-in-law, Francis Tresham. In any event, it caused enough suspicion that on the night of 4 November the undercroft beneath the House of Lords was searched by guards, where Guy Fawkes was found in possession of matches and gunpowder was found hidden under coal. After intense torture in the Tower of London Fawkes gave his true name and those of his fellow conspirators. All but one of the plotters pleaded not guilty but nevertheless the seven were found guilty of high treason and each was executed on 30 and 31 January.

The Monteagle letter
On 26 October 1605, while sitting at supper at his house in Hoxton, London, he received a letter warning of the Gunpowder Plot.

It is believed by some historians  that he authored the letter himself to win acclaim and favour with the King. Fraser posits that the note was from someone who wanted to protect Parker (either his family, such as his sister Mary Habington, or a friendly conspirator). Had it been a conspirator, such as Francis Tresham, the writer would also have intended to end the plot before it began; Parker had been too clear in his politics to assume he would remain quiet about the plot. The argument against Mary Habington having sent the letter is that the letter was too clumsy, and that there were far better ways to discreetly deliver the information, had it come from her. As for a conspirator, Parker benefited too richly—and the conspirators too terribly—for that to be the case.

After deciphering the letter, Parker rushed to Whitehall and showed it to Robert Cecil, 1st Earl of Salisbury, who then showed it to the King. On 4 November, Parker joined Thomas Howard in searching the basement of Parliament, where they found the stash of gunpowder and explosives. For his service in protecting the crown, Monteagle was rewarded with 500 pounds and 200 pounds' worth of lands.

Several other Catholic members of Parliament were absent on the planned day of the attack but Monteagle was the only member of Parliament who was confirmed to have received a letter warning of the plot.

Later life and death
In 1609, Parker invested in the second Virginia Company and became a member of the council. He had shares in the East India and North West Companies as well. Parker used his influence to protect his brother-in-law, Thomas Habington, from the possible consequence of death, after harbouring the forbidden priests at Hindlip. Although Habington was condemned, his wife's pleas to her brother secured his reprieve. Despite revealing the Gunpowder Plot, Parker seems to have retained some connections to the Catholic community. His eldest son of six children, Henry Lord Morley, was also a known Catholic and in 1609, he was suspected of sheltering students from St. Omer's seminary. Monteagle gave permission for his eldest daughter Frances Parker to become a nun, although not willing, at first, to grant her request. He eventually surrendered to his physically handicapped daughter's appeal "in respect that she was crooked, and therefore not fit for the world."

By his marriage with Elizabeth Tresham, daughter of Sir Thomas Tresham, he had six children: three sons and three daughters. The eldest son, Henry, succeeded him as 14th Baron Morley and 5th Baron Monteagle. These baronies fell into abeyance when Henry's son Thomas died in about 1686.  His eldest daughter, Frances, was a nun; the second, Catherine, married John Savage, 2nd Earl Rivers; and the youngest, Elizabeth, married Edward Cranfield, and was the mother of Edward Cranfield. Through Catherine, he was the 5× great-grandfather of Alfred, Lord Tennyson.

Parker was summoned to parliament as Baron Morley and Baron Monteagle in 1618 after the death of his father. He died on 1 July 1622 at Great Hallingbury in Essex and was reported to have received the last rites of the Roman Catholic Church before his death.

References

External links
 
 

1575 births
1622 deaths
People associated with the Gunpowder Plot
Members of the British House of Lords
16th-century English nobility
17th-century English nobility
William
Morley, William Parker, 11th Baron
4
Recusants